Luis Miguel Noriega Orozco (born 17 April 1985) is a Mexican former professional footballer who played as a midfielder.

Club career 
His professional debut came during the Apertura 2007 season, on August 5, 2007 – in a game against Club América. He scored his first professional goal in a match against Club Necaxa. He was Puebla team captain until getting transferred after the Bicentenario 2010.

Noriega was transferred to Monarcas Morelia on May 18, 2010. After 1 year of being with the club, he was then loaned out to Chiapas.

International career
Noriega earned his first international cap with Mexico on June 24, 2009, against Venezuela, he also was called up to play in the 2009 CONCACAF Gold Cup by Mexican coach Javier Aguirre.
He scored his first international goal with Mexico in the 2009 CONCACAF Gold Cup match against Nicaragua.

Career statistics

International

International goals

|- 
| 1. || 5 July 2009 || Oakland–Alameda County Coliseum, Oakland, United States ||  || 1–0 || 2–0 || 2009 CONCACAF Gold Cup
|}

Honours
Puebla
Primera A: Apertura 2006 
Ascenso MX: 2007
Copa MX: Clausura 2015

Morelia
North American SuperLiga: 2010

Querétaro
Copa MX: Apertura 2016
Supercopa MX: 2017

Mexico
CONCACAF Gold Cup: 2009

References

External links

Living people
1985 births
Association football midfielders
Lobos BUAP footballers
Club Puebla players
Atlético Morelia players
Chiapas F.C. footballers
Querétaro F.C. footballers
C.D. Veracruz footballers
Liga MX players
Ascenso MX players
Mexico international footballers
CONCACAF Gold Cup-winning players
2009 CONCACAF Gold Cup players
Footballers from the State of Mexico
Mexican footballers